The 2015–16 Philippine Basketball Association (PBA) Philippine Cup, also known as the 2015–16 SmartBRO-PBA Philippine Cup for sponsorship reasons, was the first conference of the 2015–16 PBA season. The tournament started on October 21, 2015, and was finished on February 3, 2016. The tournament did not allow teams to hire foreign players or imports.

Format
The following format was observed for the duration of the conference: 
 Single-round robin eliminations; 11 games per team; Teams are then seeded by basis on win–loss records. Ties are broken among the head-to-head records of the tied teams.
 The top two teams after the elimination round will automatically advance to the semifinals.
 The next eight teams will play in a double-phase quarterfinal round. The #3 to #6 seed will have twice-to-beat advantage against their opponent. Phase 1 matchups are:
 QF1: #3 team vs. #10 team
 QF2: #4 team vs. #9 team
 QF3: #5 team vs. #8 team
 QF4: #6 team vs. #7 team
 The winners of Phase 1 will advance to the knockout phase. The match ups are:
KO1: QF1 vs. QF4
KO2: QF2 vs. QF3
 The winners of the quarterfinals will challenge the top two teams in a best-of-seven semifinals series. Match ups are:
 SF1: #1 vs. KO2
 SF2: #2 vs. KO1
The winners in the semifinals advance to the best of seven finals.

Elimination round

Team standings

Schedule

Results

Bracket

Quarterfinals

First phase 
In this round, the higher-seeded team in the series has the twice-to-beat advantage.

(3) Rain or Shine vs. (10) Blackwater

(4) Barangay Ginebra vs. (9) Star

(5) GlobalPort vs. (8) Barako Bull

(6) TNT vs. (7) NLEX

Second phase 
This is a one-game playoff. The winner advances to the semifinals.

(3) Rain or Shine vs. (6) TNT

(4) Barangay Ginebra vs. (5) GlobalPort

In the final 8 seconds of overtime period of the knockout quarterfinal game between Barangay Ginebra San Miguel and GlobalPort Batang Pier, review showed that Stanley Pringle held the ball for over 5 seconds, which would have resulted in a five-second ball-hogging violation, but no call was made. After the final buzzer, the Batang Pier already went to the dugout, but Ginebra stayed behind. Ginebra fans, which were more than half of the crowd, were left stunned along with players and the Ginebra coaching staff. Head coach Tim Cone immediately went to center court and pleaded with the referees for a call or a review of the final 8-second possession of Globalport. He then went to the scorer's table and signed the official scorecard, signifying the team's intent to file a protest with the game's result. He stayed mum after coming out of the dugout on whether they would actually file a protest. Under the league's rules, Barangay Ginebra had until 12 noon of December 28, 2015, to file a letter of protest together with a bond, which requires a minimum of P20,000.

Some fans who waited by the players exit booed and threw coins at the car of GlobalPort forward Jay Washington, who left the venue with his family. Security struggled to control the mob of angry fans. When the car started to leave, Washington opened the window and shouted, "Better luck next conference!" to the crowd.

A day after, Barangay Ginebra did not send a formal protest to the PBA office as the 12 noon deadline lapsed. Commissioner Chito Narvasa said that the league summoned the four referees of the Ginebra-GlobalPort game, Edward Aquino, Rommel Gruta, Mardy Montoya and Bing Oliva, on December 29 and re-evaluated their performance during the quarterfinal game. According to the findings of the PBA technical committee, two violations were not called: the five-second ball-hogging violation and the backcourt violation committed by Stanley Pringle. Referees Edward Aquino and Rommel Gruta were therefore suspended for the rest of the Philippine Cup.

Semifinals 
This is a best-of-seven round. The winner advances to the finals.

(1) Alaska vs. (5) GlobalPort

(2) San Miguel vs. (3) Rain or Shine

The two-time PBA MVP Fajardo had shrugs off hard fouls by different Rain or Shine players had had given him a "hard life" as promised until game 6 wherein he finally fell down and injured his left knee (torn ACL) because of a hard box-out play by Rain or Shine forward Jireh Ibañes. Fajardo, who was wincing in pain, had to be stretchered out off the playing court at the 7:11 mark of the third and was later brought to St. Luke's Medical Center in Bonifacio Global City, Taguig.

After the game, Ibañes says he meant no harm against Fajardo. The injury had not only put a damper on San Miguel's return to the finals but also to Gilas Pilipinas 2016 Olympic qualifiers as he had to sit out for the rest of the season because of a torn ACL.

Finals

Awards

Conference
Best Player of the Conference: June Mar Fajardo 
Finals MVP: Chris Ross

Players of the Week

Statistics

Individual statistic leaders

Individual game highs

Team statistic leaders

References

External links
 PBA Official Website

Philippine Cup
PBA Philippine Cup